(I rejoice in You), 133, is a church cantata by Johann Sebastian Bach. He composed the Christmas cantata in Leipzig in 1724 for the Third Day of Christmas and first performed it on 27 December 1724. The chorale cantata is based on the 1697 hymn by Caspar Ziegler.

History and words 
Bach wrote the chorale cantata in his second year as Thomaskantor in Leipzig, as part of his second cantata cycle, for the Third Day of Christmas. The prescribed readings for the feast day were from the Epistle to the Hebrews, Christ is higher than the angels, and the prologue of the Gospel of John, also called Hymn to the Word. The cantata is based on the chorale in four stanzas  (1697) by Caspar Ziegler. It is one of the newest of the chorales which served as a base for the second annual cycle, whereas Bach otherwise preferred the beloved hymns of poets such as Martin Luther and Paul Gerhardt. The unknown poet of the cantata text retained the first and the last stanza, and paraphrased the inner stanzas closely to a sequence of recitative and aria. The text has no reference to the readings nor to the feast of John the Evangelist. It expresses the intimate joy of the individual believer about the presence of God in the Jesus child.

Bach first performed the cantata on 27 December 1724. Bach's Thomaskantor successor Gottlob Harrer  performed the cantata after Bach's death.

The cantata's autograph manuscript was purported to be owned by Wilhelm Friedemann Bach. In 1827, it was sold at auction in Berlin with several other Bach cantata autographs and manuscripts to Carl Pistor. Pistor invited Mendelssohn to catalog the auction materials, which became the original autographs in the vast Rudorff collection; in return Pistor gifted the autograph of BWV133 to Mendelssohn.

Scoring and structure 
The cantata in six movements is scored for four vocal soloists (soprano, alto, tenor, and bass), a four-part choir, cornett to double the chorale melody, two oboes d'amore, two violins, viola, and basso continuo.

 Chorus: 
 Aria (alto): 
 Recitative (tenor): 
 Aria (soprano): 
 Recitative (bass): 
 Chorale:

Music 

This melody was probably new to Bach who noted it in the score of the Sanctus, which he also composed for Christmas in 1724 and later made part of his Mass in B minor. The cornetto plays the cantus firmus with the soprano, the oboes play with violin II and viola, whereas violin 1 "shines above the rest". The lower voices are set mostly in homophony, with the exception of expressing "" (the great son of God). John Eliot Gardiner summarizes: "I find it hard to imagine music that conveys more persuasively the essence, the exuberance and the sheer exhilaration of Christmas than the opening chorus of BWV 133".

While Bach's Weimar cantata , expressed a communal joy in two choral movements and two duets, a sequence of four movements for a single voice reflects the joy of the individual believer. The alto aria is accompanied by the two oboi d'amore, the soprano aria by the strings, changing from an even time in the outer sections to a siciliano in the middle section. The tenor recitative is marked adagio twice, once to stress "" (Almighty God Himself here visits us), finally to quote from the chorale in both words and music "" (He has become a little child and is called my little Jesus). The cantata is closed by a four-part setting of the last chorale stanza.

Recordings

References

Sources 
 
 Ich freue mich in dir BWV 133; BC A 16 / Chorale cantata (3rd Christmas Day) Bach Digital
 Cantata BWV 133 Ich freue mich in dir: history, scoring, sources for text and music, translations to various languages, discography, discussion, Bach Cantatas Website
 BWV 133 Ich freue mich in dir: English translation, University of Vermont
 BWV 133 Ich freue mich in dir: text, scoring, University of Alberta
 Luke Dahn: BWV 133.6 bach-chorales.com

Church cantatas by Johann Sebastian Bach
1724 compositions
Christmas cantatas
Chorale cantatas